The 2010 H1 Unlimited season was the fifty-fifth running of the H1 Unlimited series for unlimited hydroplane, jointly sanctioned by APBA, its governing body in North America and UIM, its international body.

The series consisted of six races.

The finale of the season was the Oryx Cup, held in Doha, Ad Dawhah, Qatar. The 2010 Oryx Cup was the eighteenth running of the UIM World Championship for unlimited hydroplanes.

For 2010, Oh Boy! Oberto (Miss Madison) was the National High Point Team Champion, while Steve David was the National High Point Driver Champion.

Teams and drivers
All boats are powered by Lycoming T55 L7C, originally used in Chinook helicopters, only turbine engine currently permitted in the series.

Season schedule and results

National High Point Champions

Team Champion

For the 2010 Season, Oh Boy! Oberto (Miss Madison) was the National High Point Team Champion.

Driver Champion

For the 2010 Season, Steve David was the National High Point Driver Champion.

References

External links
 H1 Unlimited Website

H1 Unlimited
H1 Unlimited seasons
Hydro